Anisopogon may refer to:

 Anisopogon, a genus of Australian plants in the grass family
 Anisopogon (fly), a genus of Diptera in the family Asilidae or robber flies